Briggitte Bozzo (born August 19, 2001) is a Venezuelan actress.

Filmography

Awards and nominations

References 

Actresses from Caracas
2001 births
Living people
Venezuelan child actresses